That's My Work 4 is a mixtape by American rap group Tha Eastsidaz. The mixtape is hosted by DJ Drama and was released free for digital download on July 15, 2014.

Track listing

References 

Tha Eastsidaz albums
2014 mixtape albums